John Randolph McKinney (February 26, 1921 – April 5, 1997) was a United States soldier who received the Medal of Honor in World War II during the campaign to recapture the Philippines from Japanese forces in 1945. Although greatly outnumbered by about 100 Japanese soldiers, McKinney was single-handedly able to secure a crucial battlefield area before reinforcements arrived. He was presented the Medal of Honor in a White House ceremony by President Harry S. Truman on January 23, 1946.

McKinney enlisted in the United States Army from Screven County, Georgia in November 1942. He served as a Sergeant in the United States Army.

Medal of Honor citation

Heroism on Luzon, Philippines

US Army Pvt. John McKinney had stood guard duty and had just gone to his tent in the early hours May 11, 1945 on the island of Luzon, Philippines. The vanguard of a Japanese force slipped past the guard post. Sgt. Fukutaro Morii threw open McKinney's tent flap and slashed down with his sword, no doubt to minimize the sound of the as-yet undetected attack. He severed part of McKinney's ear. McKinney, a skilled hunter from Georgia, grabbed the rifle he slept with, bashed Morii in the chin and finished him off with another blow to the head.

Over the next 36 minutes, McKinney protected the flank of his company and his sleeping comrades by killing 38 of the enemy. McKinney did so through point-blank, kill-or-be-killed encounters as well as rapid-fire, accurate shots with various M1 rifles he picked up and fired at charging enemies. Early in the engagement, he returned to his foxhole where he eliminated first one wave and then part of the second wave of the main attack force. Several in the second wave made it to the foxhole where McKinney first shot and then clubbed his assailants in hand-to-hand combat.

Death
McKinney died on April 5, 1997, and is interred at Double Heads Baptist Church in Sylvania, Georgia.

Legacy
The State of Georgia renamed a highway The John R. McKinney Medal of Honor Highway in his honor.

See also

List of Medal of Honor recipients

References

Further reading
Forrest Bryant Johnson. 2007. Phantom Warrior: The Heroic True Story of Pvt. John McKinney's One-Man Stand Against the Japanese in World War II. Berkley, New York.  plus  at the Pritzker Military Library on March 6, 2017

External links
 

1921 births
1997 deaths
United States Army Medal of Honor recipients
United States Army soldiers
United States Army personnel of World War II
People from Screven County, Georgia
World War II recipients of the Medal of Honor